Jingyuan County (Xiao'erjing: ڭٍْ‌يُوًا ثِيًا) is a county under the administration of the prefecture-level city of Guyuan in the south of the Ningxia Hui Autonomous Region of the People's Republic of China, bordering Gansu province to the east, south, and southwest.

Characteristics

Jingyuan County, located at the southern tip of Ningxia Hui Autonomous Region, is the source of the Jing River. It is an agricultural region, with wheat being the primary crop. In recent years, the county has also begun to produce vegetables. The county government is located in the town of Xiangshui, and the county's postal code is 756400.

History and Demographics
According to the 1983 data, 96.8% of Jingyuan County's population (79,823 persons out of the then total population of 82,464) were Hui (Chinese Muslims) -  the highest by far percentage of the Hui in any county-level jurisdiction in Ningxia or anywhere else in China. (Ningxia's county with second-highest percentage of Hui in its total population was Tongxin County, with 79.0% Hui). According to Dru C. Gladney, the area became so heavily Hui after the suppression of the Dungan revolt (1862–1877), when many Muslims fled to, or were forcibly relocated to this mountainous district, near the Liu Pan mountain range, from other, more strategically located areas which the government wanted to keep Hui-free. Even in modern times one can still see remains of Qing-era forts that were built on hilltops to monitor the potentially troublesome Hui settlers.

Administrative divisions
Jingyuan County has 3 towns and 4 townships.
3 towns
 Xiangshui
 Liupanshan
 Jingheyuan

4 townships
 Dawan
 Huanghua
 Xingsheng
 Xinmin

Climate

References 

 Dru C. Gladney, Muslim Chinese: Ethnic Nationalism in the People's Republic. 1st ed.: Harvard University Press, 1991, ; 2nd ed., 1996. .

County-level divisions of Ningxia